Swimming with Sharks (also known as The Boss and Buddy Factor) is a 1994 American satire film written and directed by George Huang and starring Kevin Spacey, Frank Whaley and Michelle Forbes.

Plot
Buddy Ackerman, an influential movie mogul, hires Guy, a naïve young writer, as his assistant. Guy, who had just graduated from film school, believes that his new job is a golden opportunity. Despite warnings from Rex, the outgoing assistant who has become hardened under Buddy's reign, Guy remains optimistic.

Buddy turns out to be the boss from hell; he treats Guy like a slave, subjects him to sadistic (and public) verbal abuse, and has him bending over backward to do meaningless errands that go beyond just his work life. Guy is humiliated and forced to bear the brunt of his insults. Guy's only solace is his new girlfriend Dawn, a producer at Buddy's firm. When Buddy apparently fires Guy in a phone call, Guy finally snaps and takes Buddy hostage in order to exact revenge. He ties Buddy up and subjects him to severe beatings, torture and mind games. It is later revealed that due to a botched call waiting function on Buddy's home phone, Guy hears Buddy and Dawn arranging a rendezvous at Buddy's house.

Once in Guy's power, Buddy reveals for the first time a human, vulnerable side. He tells Guy that his wife had been raped and murdered on Christmas Eve 12 years prior, and reveals that he, too, was once a bullied assistant to powerful, tyrannical men and spent a decade putting up with such abuse to become successful himself. He also reveals that abusing Guy was his way of teaching Guy that he must earn his success. Dawn arrives at the scene to find Guy aiming a gun at Buddy's face and insists that she had only agreed to see Buddy as a way of helping Guy's career. Dawn pleads with Guy to put down the gun, whereupon Buddy tells Guy that he has to pull the trigger in order to get ahead in the business. After a moment's indecision, Buddy screams at Guy to shoot, which Guy does.

The climax of the film reveals that Guy killed Dawn (who is blamed for kidnapping and torturing Buddy), and was subsequently promoted. In the final scene, Guy coldly tells a former colleague to find out what he really wants and then do anything to get it, echoing the numerous times Buddy told Guy. The movie ends with a beaten up Buddy passing by Guy's office, making eye contact with him and silently gesturing to call him into his office for a meeting. Guy excuses himself and goes into Buddy's office, ignoring his ringing telephone. Buddy shuts his office doors as other employees walk by.

Cast
 Kevin Spacey as Buddy Ackerman
 Frank Whaley as Guy
 Michelle Forbes as Dawn Lockard
 Benicio del Toro as Rex
 T.E. Russell as Foster Kane
 Roy Dotrice as Cyrus Miles
 Matthew Flynt as Manny
 Patrick Fischler as Moe
 Jerry Levine as Jack

Production

George Huang decided to write the script after having a conversation with Robert Rodriguez. Rodriguez was in Los Angeles after his film El Mariachi brought him to the attention of Sony Pictures, where he befriended Huang. Huang told Rodriguez of his frustrations with filmmaking when the director encouraged him to quit his post at Sony and pursue writing full-time so Huang could produce a script to direct himself.

Huang's resultant script, "Reel Life", was picked up by Cineville executive Frank Evers, who brought in financing from independent investors, and significant production support from Sony Pictures Entertainment. The film was subsequently sold to Trimark Pictures (later assumed by Lionsgate in 2000). Cineville produced the film with Carl Colpaert, chairman of Cineville and Steve Alexander overseeing production.

Although writer George Huang himself worked as an assistant for Barry Josephson, who was the Senior Vice President of Development at Sony Pictures at the time, some have suggested that Buddy's character was inspired by real life movie mogul Scott Rudin, while others suggest he is based on producer Joel Silver with Guy being based on Alan Schechter, Silver's assistant in the early 1990s.

The director Buddy hires in the film, Foster Kane, is named after Orson Welles' character in the 1941 film Citizen Kane, Charles Foster Kane.

Reception
On Rotten Tomatoes, the film has an approval rating of 76% based on reviews from 38 critics. The site's consensus states: "Swimming With Sharks is a smart, merciless Hollywood satire that's darkly hilarious and observant, thanks to Kevin Spacey's performance as ruthless studio mogul Buddy Ackerman." On Metacritic it has a score of a 66% based on reviews from 14 critics, indicating "generally favorable reviews".

Roger Ebert gave it three out of four stars.

The film is recognized by American Film Institute in these lists:
 2003: AFI's 100 Years...100 Heroes & Villains:
 Buddy Ackerman – Nominated Villain

Stage adaptation
A stage adaptation penned by Michael Lesslie had its world premiere at London's Vaudeville Theatre in October 2007. The play starred Christian Slater as Buddy, Matt Smith as Guy, Arthur Darvill as Rex and Helen Baxendale as Dawn. Academy Award nominee Demián Bichir opened a Spanish version of the play in Mexico City in January 2012.

A Singapore theatre company, PANGDEMONiUM!, opened the play in Singapore at Drama Centre from 20 September to 7 October 2012. The play starred Adrian Pang as Buddy, George Young as Guy and Janice Koh as Dawn.

Television adaptation
In 2022, an adaptation written by Kathleen Robertson streamed on The Roku Channel after premiering at South by Southwest. The adaptation stars Diane Kruger and Kiernan Shipka.

References

External links

 

1990s American films
1990s black comedy films
1990s English-language films
1994 films
1994 comedy-drama films
1994 directorial debut films
American black comedy films
American comedy-drama films
American satirical films
Films about film directors and producers
Films about Hollywood, Los Angeles
Films about kidnapping in the United States
Films about screenwriters
Films adapted into plays
Films directed by George Huang
Films set in Los Angeles
Films set in offices
Films shot in Los Angeles County, California
Torture in films
Trimark Pictures films